The discography of American rapper Fredo Bang consists of a studio album, two compilation albums, six mixtapes, and forty-four singles.

Albums

Studio albums

Compilation Albums

Mixtapes

Singles

References

Discographies of American artists
Hip hop discographies